The Violin Sonata in F major, composed in 1838 by Felix Mendelssohn, but remained unpublished during the composer's lifetime. It remained so until 1953 when violinist Yehudi Menuhin arranged it for publication.

Background

Mendelssohn began work on the Violin Sonata in 1838, the same year he started work on the Violin Concerto in E minor. By the 15th of June 1838 he had completed the composition in draft form, but rejected the work as a "...wretched sonata..." .

It was not until 1839 that Mendelssohn began work on revising the sonata by rewriting the first movement. However the task remained uncompleted at his death in 1847 and it was not until 1953, that violinist Yehudi Menuhin revived the work and prepared it for publication by revising the first movement based on Mendelssohn's incomplete revision.

Structure

The composition has three movements:

 Allegro vivace
 Adagio
 Assai vivace

A typical performance lasts about 22 minutes.

References
Notes

Sources

External links

Chamber music by Felix Mendelssohn
Mendelssohn
1838 compositions
Compositions in F major
Compositions by Felix Mendelssohn published posthumously